MS Batory was a Polish ocean liner which was the flagship of Gdynia-America Line, named after Stefan Batory, the sixteenth-century king of Poland. After Allied wartime service, mainly under the UK Admiralty, she became in 1951 the flagship of the Polish Ocean Lines and the Polish merchant fleet. She is often described as the "Pride of the Polish Merchant Marine". Batory along with her sister Piłsudski were the two most popular ocean liners of Poland.

History

Construction
Gdynia America Line (Gdynia–Ameryka Linie Żeglugowe, GAL), a Polish-Danish partnership based in Gdynia, was formed in 1934 as successor to Polskie Transatlantyckie Towarzystwo Okrętowe (PTTO), an enterprise originally dedicated to transporting Polish migrants to the USA. It changed its focus to leisure travel and for that purpose decided to commission a new vessel. Batory was built in 1934–5 at the Cantieri Riuniti dell'Adriatico Monfalcone shipyard in Trieste, Italy, under an arrangement where part of the commission was paid in shipments of coal from Poland.

She was among the best-known Polish ships of all time. She was launched on 3 July 1935. She began regular service in May 1936 on the Gdynia — New York run, and by 1939 had carried over 3,000 passengers.

World War II

Mobilized at the outbreak of World War II, she served as a troop ship and a hospital ship by the Allied Navy for the rest of the war. She was also one of the last ships to leave St Jean de Luz during the final evacuation of Polish troops from France. She was also used for secretly shipping many valuable Polish treasures to Canada for safekeeping. She participated in the evacuation of Dunkirk late May early June, taking aboard 2,500 people. Later she carried as many as 6,000 people in one evacuation. In June to July, she secretly transported much of the UK's gold reserves (£40 million) from Greenock, Scotland to Montreal, Canada for safekeeping. On 5 August 1940 she left Liverpool with convoy WS 2 (Winston's Specials) evacuating 477 children to Sydney, Australia, under the Children's Overseas Reception Board until the war was over. She sailed via Cape Town, India, Singapore to where she had carried 300 troops and Sydney. The journey had been a happy one, with so much music and laughter that the Batory was dubbed the "Singing Ship" and was the subject of a book of the same name. In April 1942 British writer Roald Dahl boarded the Batory, bound for Halifax, Canada.

She was involved in the allied invasion of Oran, Algeria in 1942. That same year she took troops to India and took part in the occupation of Sicily and southern France, where she was the flagship of General Jean de Lattre de Tassigny, Commander-in-Chief of the French Army. She came under attack several times from the ground and the air, but managed to escape serious damage.

Dubbed the Lucky Ship for her military career during World War II, she was a sister ship to the less fortunate  which sank in November 1939 off the east coast of Scotland.

Postwar career
Returned to post-war Poland in 1946, she resumed civilian service after a refit, transporting such eminent people as Ryszard Kapuściński. From May 1949 through to January 1951, she was the subject of several political incidents in which American dockers and shipyard workers in the United States refused to unload her cargo, or to service the ship.

After these incidents, she was withdrawn from the North Atlantic route, refurbished at Hebburn for service in the tropics, and sailed in August 1951 from Gdynia and Southampton to Bombay and Karachi, via Gibraltar, Malta, Aden, and Suez. In 1957, she returned to the North Atlantic run. She continued in service until 1969, when she was decommissioned and became a floating hotel in Gdynia. However, after about a year, she was sold back to Polish Ocean Lines, and from there she was sold for scrap to Hong Kong. She left Gdynia on 31 March 1971 and arrived to the scrapyard on 26 May. On 2 June, the Polish flag was lowered and the scrapping process began. The ship had been scrapped completely by 1972.

She was replaced by a larger vessel , which operated from April 1969 until 1988.

Gallery

References

Further reading

External links
Peter Wieslaw Grajda: M/S BATORY, the Polish Ocean Liner - History & Photographs
History of M/S Pilsudski and M/S Batory
A photo of MS Batory at Suez Canal Zone 1953
M/S Batory, the Polish Ocean Liner - History & Photographs

Passenger ships of Poland
Ocean liners
Cruise ships
Ships built in Monfalcone
Ships built by Cantieri Riuniti dell'Adriatico
1935 ships
Ships of the Gdynia-America Line